"Two Tonys" is the 53rd episode of the HBO original series The Sopranos and the first of the show's fifth season. Written by David Chase and Terence Winter, it was directed by Tim Van Patten and originally aired on March 7, 2004.

Starring
 James Gandolfini as Tony Soprano
 Lorraine Bracco as Dr. Jennifer Melfi 
 Edie Falco as Carmela Soprano
 Michael Imperioli as Christopher Moltisanti
 Dominic Chianese as Corrado Soprano, Jr. 
 Steven Van Zandt as Silvio Dante
 Tony Sirico as Paulie Gualtieri
 Robert Iler as Anthony Soprano, Jr. 
 Jamie-Lynn DiScala as Meadow Soprano
 Drea de Matteo as Adriana La Cerva
 Aida Turturro as Janice Soprano Baccalieri
 Steven R. Schirripa as Bobby Baccalieri
 Vincent Curatola as Johnny Sack
 Steve Buscemi as Tony Blundetto**
** = photo only

Guest starring

** = photo only

Synopsis
Four mobsters imprisoned in the 1980s are released on parole. Three of them are a generation older than Tony: Soprano family capo Michele "Feech" La Manna, Lupertazzi family consigliere Angelo Garepe, and Lupertazzi capo Phil Leotardo. The fourth is Tony's cousin, Tony "Tony B" Blundetto. Feech wishes to return to work as a shy and sports bettor, which Tony and Uncle Junior permit so long as he does not compete with other operators. Tony is excited about his cousin's release and plans a lavish welcome party.

Christopher and Paulie confront each other when their re-telling of their Pine Barrens ordeal devolves into mutual recriminations. Christopher begins to resent the custom that, being of lower rank, he is expected to pay when they dine in a restaurant. One evening, he forces Paulie to pay, but Paulie demands that Christopher repay him the next day and threatens that interest will be added if he does not. When he complains to Tony, he tells Christopher to keep paying the tabs, as he himself once did. In Atlantic City, Paulie contrives to inflate their dinner bill to nearly $1,200. As they argue in the parking lot, their waiter confronts Christopher about his poor tip, and when they dismiss him, he insults them. An enraged Christopher throws a brick at his head. The waiter collapses and has a seizure, causing a panicked Paulie to shoot him dead. Paulie takes the $1,200 as he and Christopher speed off in their cars. The next day, they make amends and split the original tab.

Carmine Lupertazzi has a stroke and is hospitalized. At the hospital, Johnny Sack tells Tony that he is still angry that he backed out of their agreement to kill Carmine the previous year.

Janice and Bobby Baccalieri are now married. A year after his separation, Tony is living in his mother's former home.

One evening, while A.J. is in the backyard, a large black bear appears. Terrified, he calls for his mother, who drives off the bear and calls the authorities. Tony visits the next day and talks to Carmela, but the discussion turns hostile when she criticizes him for buying A.J. too many gifts. As they argue about money, she accuses him of calling Italy on his cellphone, and he tells her that Furio's life is “finished” if certain people find him. Tony tasks Benny and Little Paulie to guard his backyard, and Carmela reluctantly supplies them with a rifle.

After watching The Prince of Tides with his mistress, Valentina, Tony feels driven to see Dr. Melfi again, and he sends flowers and a greeting card to her office. When he calls her to set up a date, she declines, feeling that it would be unprofessional to date a former patient. She has a sexual dream about him. Tony then schedules an appointment, as a pretext to tell her he loves her, and he forcibly kisses her. In a therapy session with her own psychiatrist, she admits her initial attraction to Tony. Tony makes a third attempt to court her by offering cruise tickets, but she declines again. At his request, she tells him the aspects of his character she could not accept; but there are things he cannot bear to hear, and he storms out. He returns home, in a sense, and takes over guard duty from Benny.

First appearances
Michele "Feech" La Manna: former capo of the now-defunct La Manna crew who was incarcerated during the 1980s
Angelo Garepe: longtime Lupertazzi family Consigliere
Phil Leotardo: (image only) Capo of the Lupertazzi family who was sent to prison in the early 1980s
Tony Blundetto: (image only) Tony's cousin and DiMeo/Soprano crime family member who was sent to jail in 1986 for hijacking a truck

Deceased
Raoul: an Atlantic City waiter who complained to Paulie and Christopher about a poor tip. Christopher hit him in the head with a brick, causing him to have a seizure. Paulie then shot Raoul dead.

Title reference
 Tony attempts to demonstrate to Dr. Melfi that there are two Tony Sopranos, one of whom she has never seen before and he wants to show her.
 The title is also a reference to DiMeo/Soprano crime family member and Tony Soprano's namesake Tony Blundetto newly released from prison

Production
 The new addition to the series writing staff beginning with Season 5, Matthew Weiner, plays the Mafia expert on the news broadcast who introduces the new gangster characters. Previously, series writers Terence Winter and David Chase also made cameo appearances on the show, as Dr. Melfi's patient and a man in Italy, respectively.
 Steve Buscemi joins the main cast as Tony Blundetto and is now billed in the opening credits, although he does not appear in this episode other than in the form of photographs during the "Class of '04" news report. Buscemi previously directed two Sopranos episodes, "Pine Barrens" (Season 3) and "Everybody Hurts" (Season 4), and he continued to direct for the show, as well as act.
 Jamie-Lynn Sigler is billed by her married name as "Jamie-Lynn DiScala" during this season.
 Vince Curatola is now exclusively billed in an individual credit from this point onwards. During Season 4 he had often been billed in a pairing with another actor. He is still only billed for the episodes in which he appears, however. 
 The character Sophia Baccalieri is now played by Miryam Coppersmith, who replaced Lexie Sperduto from Season 4.
 Toni Kalem, who plays Angie Bonpensiero in the series, becomes a story editor for the show starting with this episode.
 This episode is the first season opener wherein Tony is not featured picking up The Star-Ledger at the foot of his driveway. Instead, Meadow runs over the newspaper with her car.
 The preface to an April 10, 2002 Star-Ledger article titled, "Jersey mob soon to get infusion of old blood: Lawmen are wary as jail terms end" reads: "(Editor's Note: Sopranos creator David Chase revealed that the story arc of Season 5 was inspired by a Star-Ledger article on the RICO trials of the '80s. We've combed our archives and believe this may be the article he was referring to.")

Other cultural references
 The real reference to the Two Tonys was a famous hit carried out by Jimmy the weasel Fratianno on Tony Brancato and his criminal associate Tony Trombino, two young mobsters performing robberies in Los Angeles and Las Vegas without the sanction of the Los Angeles family. Jack Dragna told Jimmy Fratianno they needed to be "clipped", and asked Jimmy to set "something up". Within a few days, Fratianno set up the Two Tonys and killed them in their car. (August 6, 1951)
 Tony gets angry upon learning Carmela did not inform him of a bear sighting, saying this is not Little House on the Prairie.
 Tony greets Feech La Manna with: "You go straight from the joint to Earl Scheib?" when telling him he has a tan.
 Tony observes that Junior's house is like the Bowery Boys, with secret codes.
 Feech La Manna calls himself Fred Astaire when told not to "step on anyone's toes".
 Carmela tells Benny, whom Tony has sent to "protect" her and A. J., that he shouldn't sit outside like A Fistful of Dollars.  
 Christopher is shown reading My Search for Bill W. by Mel B., the biography of the founder of Alcoholics Anonymous.
 When trying to persuade Dr. Melfi that it is ethically permissible for her to date him, Tony references information that he learned from the Dr. Phil show.
 Tony tells Christopher that he paid for so many restaurant dinners over the years that he put a new wing on Peter Luger's.

Connections to prior episodes
 At the Bada Bing, Christopher reiterates to Vito Spatafore, Benny Fazio, and Patsy Parisi the story of his and Paulie's mishaps in the "Pine Barrens" with the Russian mobster.
 When trying to convince Carmella to take AJ to a hotel after multiple bear sightings in their backyard Tony jokingly mentions that AJ likes room service, which is a reference to AJ's comment about room service when Tony was trying to tell him about the family's proud history of dedication to work in "Watching Too Much Television".

Music
 The song played in the opening scenes, then heard on Carmela's radio, and then over the end credits is "Heaven Only Knows" by Emmylou Harris.
 The song blaring from Meadow's car when she comes to pick up A.J. is "Bichu Rap" by Titi Robin.
 The song playing at the restaurant where the guys eat dinner with their goomahs is "Mia Serenata" by Jimmy Fontana.
 At the start of the scene where Tony's crew were having dinner at the Atlantic City restaurant, "Band of Gold" by Freda Payne is heard, as is "Let's Get It On" by Marvin Gaye.

References

External links
"Two Tonys"  at HBO

The Sopranos (season 5) episodes
2004 American television episodes
Television episodes written by David Chase
Television episodes written by Terence Winter
Television episodes directed by Tim Van Patten
Atlantic City, New Jersey in fiction